Popplewell is a surname. People with this surname include:

 Andrew Popplewell (born 1959), judge of the High Court of England and Wales
 Anna Popplewell (born 1988), English actress
 Cicely Popplewell, early computer programmer in Manchester who worked with Alan Turing
 Dan Popplewell, English musician, co-founder of Ooberman
 Don Popplewell (born c. 1949), American football player
 Ernest Popplewell, Baron Popplewell (1899–1977), British politician
 Fred Popplewell, Australian golfer and winner of the Australian Open
 Jack Popplewell (1911–1996), English writer and playwright
 Lulu Popplewell (born 1991), English actress
 Martin Popplewell, British newsreader
 Nick Popplewell (born 1964), Irish rugby player
 Nigel Popplewell (born 1957), English cricketer
 Sir Oliver Popplewell (born 1927), British judge
 Paul Popplewell (born 1977), English actor
 Richard Popplewell (born 1935), English organist and composer